Hearts on the Nightline is the fifth studio album by Australian rock music singer-songwriter Richard Clapton. It was recorded in the USA, produced by Dallas Smith and released in Australia in April 1979. It peaked at No. 17 on the Kent Music Report Albums Chart.

Track listing

Charts

Release history

References 

1979 albums
Richard Clapton albums
Festival Records albums
Infinity Records albums